Felix Ritzinger (born 23 December 1996) is an Austrian racing cyclist, who currently rides for UCI Continental team .

Major results

Road

2019
 1st Stage 3b Tour of Szeklerland
 4th Time trial, National Road Championships
 8th Raiffeisen Grand Prix
2020
 3rd Time trial, National Road Championships
2021
 2nd Time trial, National Road Championships
 2nd GP Slovenia
 8th GP Kranj
2022
 4th Time trial, National Road Championships
 4th GP Vipava Valley & Crossborder Goriška
 8th GP Slovenian Istria

Track

2015
 1st  Pursuit, National Track Championships
2016
 National Track Championships
1st  Pursuit
1st  Scratch
2017
 National Track Championships
1st  Pursuit
1st  Scratch
2018
 National Track Championships
1st  Pursuit
1st  Kilometer
1st  Keirin
2019
 National Track Championships
1st  Pursuit
1st  Madison (with Tim Wafler)
1st  Omnium
2020
 National Track Championships
1st  Pursuit
1st  Madison (with Valentin Götzinger)

Cyclo-cross
2015–2016
 1st  National Under-23 Championships
2016–2017
 1st  National Under-23 Championships
 3rd National Championships
2017–2018
 3rd National Championships
2018–2019
 2nd National Championships

Mountain bike
2014
 1st  National Junior XCO Championships
2016
 1st  National Under-23 XCO Championships

References

External links
 

1996 births
Living people
Austrian male cyclists
Cyclists from Vienna
21st-century Austrian people